Liliana Heker (born 1943) is an Argentine writer. She wrote and edited left-wing literary journals during the Dictatorship in the 1970s and 1980s, using veiled critiques as a means of protest and engaging in vigorous debate with exiled writers such as Julio Cortázar. 

She was born in Buenos Aires and her professional writing started at the age of 17 with the support of Abelardo Castillo.

Books
Her books include:
 Acuario (1972), Centro Ed. De América Latina: Buenos Aires
 The Stolen Party (1982)
 Zona de clivaje (1990), Legasa: Buenos Aires
 El fin de la historia (1996), Alfaguara - Suma (paperback 2004), 
 Las hermanas de Shakespeare (1999), Aguilar: Buenos Aires
 Los Bordes de Lo Real
 El Partido Rubado
 Los Que Vieron la zarza

References

 Bio details, International Literary Festival, Berlin
 Biography and bibliography, Government of Buenos Aires

Further reading
 Gwendolyn Díaz, Women and Power in Argentine Literature: Stories, Interviews, and Critical Essays, University of Texas Press (paperback 2007),  - publisher's details accessed at 

1943 births
Living people
Argentine people of German descent
20th-century Argentine women writers
20th-century Argentine writers
Date of birth missing (living people)